Jam Jerd (also Romanized as Jamjird; also known as Jam Jūd and Dzhamdzhird) is a village in Ilat-e Qaqazan-e Gharbi Rural District, Kuhin District, Qazvin County, Qazvin Province, Iran. At the 2006 census, its population was 492, in 103 families. This village is populated by Azerbaijani Turks.

References 

Populated places in Qazvin County